Luilang, or ambiguously Ketagalan (Ketangalan, Tangalan), was a Formosan language spoken south of modern-day Taipei in northern Taiwan by one of several peoples that have been called Ketagalan. The language probably went extinct in the mid-20th century and it is very poorly attested.

Location
According to oral tradition, the Luilang people originally inhabited four villages near Taipei: Luili (雷里, Leili), Siulang (秀朗, Xiulang), Bulisiat (務裡薛, Wulixue) and Liau-a (了阿, Liao'a). These merged under the combined name Luilang (雷朗, Leilang), and later migrated to their current location in Outer Oat-a (外挖仔庄, Waiwazizhuang) in the 18th century.

Name
The name 'Ketagalan' is used by Ethnologue and Glottolog for the Luilang language. However, that name is ambiguous, originally referring to all of plains tribes of northern Taiwan. There has been argument in the literature as to whether it is better applied to Luilang, to the south and west of Taipei, or to Basay, to the east. 'Luilang' is an ancestral village name, and so unambiguous for the language southwest of Taipei, whereas 'Basay' is the endonym of the language to the east, and also unambiguous.

Numerals
The numerals of Luilang are rather divergent. For instance, the Basay language has numerals 5–10 that are cognate with Proto-Malayo-Polynesian, which Luilang does not. Forms recorded by Guérin (using French transcription), Ino (using Japanese transcription) and Ogawa are:

Notes

References

 
 

Extinct languages of Asia
Languages of Taiwan
Formosan languages